Margery J. Turner (1921−2004) was an American dancer, choreographer and author. Turner earned a B.S. degree from Chicago Teachers College (now Chicago State University) in 1943, an M.S. degree from the University of Wisconsin-Madison in 1947, and a Doctoral degree from New York University in 1957.

Turner introduced modern dance into the curriculum at the University of Nevada, Reno, and at the University of Illinois at Urbana-Champaign from 1947 to 1951. She developed the B.A. and B.F.A. programs in Modern Dance and established the dance department at the Mason Gross School of the Arts at Rutgers University where she spent the last 27 years of her teaching career. The Margery J. Turner Choreographer Prize at the Mason Gross School of the Arts was established in her honor. Turner authored three books including New Dance: Approaches to Nonliteral Choreography (University of Pittsburgh Press, 1971). It was reviewed in the American Dance Guild's magazine Dance Scope in 1971.

References

American female dancers
American dancers
American choreographers
1921 births
2004 deaths
20th-century American women
Chicago State University alumni
University of Wisconsin–Madison alumni
New York University alumni
21st-century American women